Brand of the Devil is a 1944 American Western film written by Elmer Clifton and directed by Harry L. Fraser. The film stars Dave O'Brien, James Newill and Guy Wilkerson, with Ellen Hall, I. Stanford Jolley and Charles King. The film was released on July 30, 1944, by Producers Releasing Corporation.

Plot

The plot concerns a female ranch owner who is losing cattle to a gang of rustlers called The Devil's Brand. She turns to the Texas Rangers for help, and they send in three Rangers undercover to bring the rustlers to justice.

Cast
Dave O'Brien as Tex Wyatt
James Newill as Jim Steel
Guy Wilkerson as Panhandle, alias Brand McGee
Ellen Hall as Molly Dawson
I. Stanford Jolley as Jack Varno (owner, Golden Ace)
Charles King as Bucko Lynn – Devil's Brand Gang
Reed Howes as Duke Cutter – Devil's Brand Gang
Budd Buster as Henry Wilburn – Molly's Foreman
Karl Hackett as Jeff Palin (Sheriff in credits)
Kermit Maynard as Gripper Joe – Devil's Brand Gang
Ed Cassidy as Sheriff Parker (character credited as Jeff Palin)

See also
The Texas Rangers series:
 The Rangers Take Over (1942)
 Bad Men of Thunder Gap (1943)
 West of Texas (1943)
 Border Buckaroos (1943)
 Fighting Valley (1943)
 Trail of Terror (1943)
 The Return of the Rangers (1943)
 Boss of Rawhide (1943)
 Outlaw Roundup (1944)
 Guns of the Law (1944)
 The Pinto Bandit (1944)
 Spook Town (1944)
 Brand of the Devil (1944)
 Gunsmoke Mesa (1944)
 Gangsters of the Frontier (1944)
 Dead or Alive (1944)
 The Whispering Skull (1944)
 Marked for Murder (1945)
 Enemy of the Law (1945)
 Three in the Saddle (1945)
 Frontier Fugitives (1945)
 Flaming Bullets (1945)

References

External links

1944 films
American black-and-white films
1944 Western (genre) films
Producers Releasing Corporation films
American Western (genre) films
1940s English-language films
1940s American films